The 2020 Dally M Awards were presented on Monday 19 October 2020. They are the official annual awards of the National Rugby League and are named after Dally Messenger.

Dally M Medal 
Dally M Player of the Year:  Jack Wighton

Dally M Awards 
The Dally M Awards are, as usual, conducted at the close of the regular season and hence do not take games played in the finals series into account. The Dally M Medal is for the official player of the year, while the Provan-Summons Medal was awarded to the New Zealand Warriors for the sacrifices the club made in relocating to Australia to keep the season alive due to the COVID-19 pandemic.

Team of the Year

Judging panel 
 Brett Kimmorley
 Jimmy Smith
 Darren Lockyer
 Greg Alexander
 Corey Parker
 Andrew Ryan
 Andrew Johns
 Steve Roach
 Johnathan Thurston
 Dene Halatau
 Billy Moore
 Gary Belcher
 Ben Ikin
 L. Lewis
 Matt Elliott
 Justin Hodges
 Scott Sattler
 Sam Thaiday
 Nathan Hindmarsh
 Anthony Minichiello
 Ryan Girdler
 Steve Menzies
 Mark Geyer
 Petero Civoniceva
 Dallas Johnson
 Ben Galea
 Alan Tongue
 Tony Puletua
 Wally Lewis
 Paul Whatuira

See also 

 Dally M Awards
 Dally M Medal
 2020 NRL season

Notes

References 

Dally M Awards
2020 NRL season
2020 awards